Jaffarabad, Gilgit-Baltistan may refer to:
 Jaffarabad, Gilgit district
 Jaffarabad, Nagar district